Real-time labor-market information (LMI) is the generation of data on labor demand from open Internet sources. Real-time feeds give an immediate view into conditions that trades precision for currency.  Because real-time labor market information is scraped from employer, industry organizations, recruiters and job boards and interpreted using natural language text interpretation, it is intrinsically subject to mis-identifications, missed information, and duplications. Nevertheless, real-time LMI has become one of the primary sources of data for researchers, corporate HR, and workforce agencies (for example, the Texas Workforce Commission) because:
 Analysis based on a near complete population of jobs
 Data that is highly indicative of current conditions across broad geographic, industry, and skill segments

External links
 Using Real-time Labor Market Information
 Brookings Institution - LMI Forum - Real Time Labor Market Information
 Using Real-Time LMI To Explore Green Jobs
 Credentials that Work: Innovations in Labor-Market Information

E-recruitment